West Midlands Trains (WMT) is a train operating company in the United Kingdom. It operates passenger trains on the West Midlands franchise between London and the English Midlands under two trade names: West Midlands Railway (WMR) (within the West Midlands region) and London Northwestern Railway (LNR) (outside the region).

West Midlands Trains was created as a consortium of three companies, Abellio, JR East, and Mitsui & Co, which joined to bid for the West Midlands franchise; they were amongst the three bids to be shortlisted in April 2016, and were awarded the franchise during August 2017. In addition to the DfT, it is also accountable to the West Midlands Rail Executive for services that operate wholly within the West Midlands region. On 10 December 2017, West Midlands Trains took over operations from the prior operator, London Midland. As per the original terms of the franchise, West Midlands Trains is expected to continue to operate it until March 2026.

During October 2017, West Midlands Trains revealed details for its planned procurement of new rolling stock; 26 CAF Civity diesel multiple units (80 carriages) and 81 electric multiple units based on Bombardier Transportation's Aventra platform (333 carriages), have been ordered and will replace various classes inherited from prior operators. It also became the launch customer for the Class 230 diesel electric multiple unit that are upcycled London Underground D78 Stock, these entered service in April 2019. During 2020, service levels were deliberately reduced by West Midlands Trains as a response to the COVID-19 pandemic. West Midlands Trains is amongst those train operators that are impacted by the 2022–2023 United Kingdom railway strikes, being only capable of operating a minimal timetable on days of the strikes due to the number of staff involved.

History

Background

In April 2016, the Department for Transport (DfT) announced the shortlist of bidders for the West Midlands franchise, comprising the incumbent operator Govia, MTR Corporation, and West Midlands Trains: a consortium of Abellio (70%), JR East (15%) and Mitsui & Co (15%). During July 2016, MTR Corporation abruptly opted to withdraw itself from the bidding process.

In August 2016, a formal invitation to tender for the franchise was issued to the two remaining bidders. During August 2017, the West Midlands Trains consortium was awarded the franchise; it took over operations from the prior operator, London Midland, on 10 December 2017. The franchise is scheduled to run until March 2026.

Unlike the previous London Midland franchise, which was solely accountable to the DfT, West Midlands is also accountable for services that operate wholly within the West Midlands region to the West Midlands Rail Executive, a group of 16 local authorities. However, the DfT must still approve any changes that the West Midlands Rail Executive may wish to make until the franchise is re-let.

By mid-2020, West Midlands Trains had considerably curtailed its services in response to the significant decline of passenger travel amid the COVID-19 pandemic. From 15 June 2020, both passengers and staff on public transport in England, including West Midlands Trains services, were required to wear face coverings while travelling, and that anyone failing to do so would be liable to be refused travel or fined.

In May 2021, the company was criticised after it sent an email to 2,500 employees apparently thanking them for their work during the COVID-19 pandemic and offering a financial bonus; however, employees who clicked on the link within the email were informed that there was, in fact, no bonus and that the email had been a "phishing simulation test”.

In September 2021, following emergency measures to deal with the financial impact of the COVID-19 pandemic, the DfT awarded WMT a direct contract, replacing its existing franchise agreement, until 20 September 2026.

West Midlands Trains is one of several train operators impacted by the 2022–2023 United Kingdom railway strikes, which are the first national rail strikes in the UK for three decades. Its workers are amongst those who are participating in industrial action due to a dispute over pay and working conditions. West Midlands Trains has only been capable of operating a very minimalist timetable on any of the planned dates for the strikes due to the number of staff involved.

It was included in the sale of Abellio's United Kingdom business to Transport UK Group in February 2023.

Branding
WMT services are split into two businesses which operate under two distinct sub-brands. This name was chosen in tribute to the former London & North Western Railway (LNWR), the company that operated services on the route between 1846 and 1922. Branding of trains and associated publicity use a green colour scheme with a logo composed of the letters L, N and W.

Services running in Birmingham and the West Midlands region – previously operated by London Midland under the London Midland City brand – are operated by WMT under the West Midlands Railway brand. WMT have chosen to operate these services as a distinct business unit in order to facilitate a possible future devolution of these services from the national DfT to the West Midlands Combined Authority. These services bear an orange and purple colour scheme and are branded with a hexagonal "WM" monogram adopted as part of a shared branding initiative under Transport for West Midlands, in which several transport modes in the West Midlands County use similar branding to emphasise integrated transport. Each mode bears a variant of the "WM" logo: West Midlands Buses use a red logo, West Midlands Metro trams use a blue logo, cycling initiatives are branded with a green logo, West Midlands Railway bears an orange logo, and the West Midlands Rail Executive uses a turquoise logo.

London Northwestern Railway services
WMT's services along the West Coast Main Line rail corridor are operated under the London Northwestern Railway brand. These services include:

 branch line services off the south of the West Coast main line.

As of December 2022, the typical off-peak Monday - Saturday London Northwestern Railway service pattern, with frequencies in trains per hour (tph), includes:

West Midlands Railway services
In the West Midlands region, WMT's train services are operated under the West Midlands Railway brand. These services include:

 services through Birmingham;
 the Leamington to Coventry and Coventry to Nuneaton branch lines.

Services on the short Stourbridge Town branch line are run by the open access operator Pre Metro Operations, who operate services on behalf of WMT under the West Midlands Railway brand name.

As of December 2022, the typical off-peak Monday - Saturday West Midlands Railway service pattern, with frequencies in trains per hour (tph), includes:

Sunday services are generally hourly on most routes however:

Planned changes 

Planned  changes included:
 reintroduction of calls at Barlaston and therefore closure of Wedgwood. This will mean the end of the long-standing rail replacement bus service. From 10 December 2017, the Stafford – Stoke-on-Trent rail replacement bus was cut back to run only between Stoke-on-Trent and Norton Bridge, via Wedgwood, Barlaston and Stone.
 reintroduction of calls at Polesworth, refurbishing and reopening both platforms.

Rolling stock
WMT inherited a fleet of Class 139, 150, 153, 170, 172, 319, 323 and 350 units from London Midland, but as the newer units enter service, some will be returned to the leasing companies that own them.

Current fleet

Class 139 Parry People Movers
The concept of using the lightweight railcar dates from 2006 when a year-long pilot scheme began on the Stourbridge Town branch line on Sundays, using a Parry People Movers PPM50 unit constructed in 2002 and numbered as 999900 under TOPS. The success of this trial led to the provision of regular services using the technology in the franchise plans for the new West Midlands Franchise. Following the award of the franchise to London Midland, it placed an order for two PPM60 units with Parry People Movers, through Porterbrook. The service itself was operated for London Midland by Pre Metro Operations.

These two units are 139 001 and 139 002, composed of vehicle numbers 39001 and 39002 in the British carriage and wagon numbering and classification system. The vehicles are mechanically similar to 999 900, but are approximately one metre longer. They were intended to start operating on the Stourbridge Town branch in 2008. In January 2009 it was confirmed that 139001 was still undergoing testing at Chasewater Railway and 139002 was still not completed.

Despite the difficulties in the commissioning of the two Class 139 units, London Midland consistently outlined its faith that they would be ready to enter service. In March 2009, it was announced that the first unit had received its passenger certification from Network Rail, allowing it to carry passengers. London Midland stated that they would begin a phased entry into service, starting with weekend operation in April, leading up to a full service by the timetable change in May 2009. Until then, London Midland temporarily returned a Class 153 to operating the branch service. 139 002 officially entered service on 29 March 2009 as part of the type's phased entry. This unit had previously worked in full service, including all-day on Monday 11 May 2009 and previously had worked all morning services during February and March 2009. In May 2009, the first unit, 139 001 was finally delivered to Stourbridge, with 999 900 removed at the same time. Test unit 999 900 had been on the branch line between 2005 and 2009. At the point of introduction, they displaced a single Class 153 DMU that was previously allocated to the branch line. By December 2009, the 200,000th passenger had been carried by the railcars.

Class 170 and 172 DMUs
West Midlands Trains operate a total of 35 two-car and three-car Class 172 units, 27 of which had been ordered by predecessor London Midland, who originally planned for them to enter service by the end of 2010 on services to and from Birmingham Snow Hill, replacing Class 150s. The original 27 sets have revised front ends with end gangways which make the trains look like the Electrostar family of units.

From 1 September 2011, the Class 172s started operating on the Snow Hill Lines with some weekend work from Birmingham – Hereford. When first used in service, the units suffered a fault with engine vibration in the passenger cabin, which has since been rectified.

The units were originally meant to replace all of the Class 150s, however three were retained until 2019 and moved on to Northern after the Class 172/0 and Class 230 units entered service. Between late 2018 and early 2019 West Midlands Railway inherited the London Overground 172/0s to replace the remaining Class 150s and Class 153s operating on the Coventry to Leamington line, the Coventry to Nuneaton line and Birmingham to Hereford. All had entered service by May 2019.

During November and December 2020, the centre vehicles of the Class 170/6 units were removed and transferred to CrossCountry to extend some of their two-carriage Class 170 units. The Class 170/6 units which remained at West Midlands Trains have been renumbered to reflect them becoming Class 170/5 units, before being moved to East Midlands Railway after the Class 196 units are introduced.

In May 2021, Chiltern Railways' fleet of four Class 172/1s transferred to West Midlands Trains. This transfer means that all of the Class 172 units are operated by West Midlands Trains. The initial sublease contract was until December 2021, the end of Chiltern Railways' franchise agreement, but the units have remained with West Midlands Trains, with Chiltern stating that the 172/1s would not be returning to them.

Class 196 Civity 
WMT is in the process of replacing its fleet of 23 Class 170/5 and 170/6 Turbostar and eight Class 153 units, which operate on West Midlands Railway services, with 26 new Class 196 Civity units.

The Class 153 units left West Midlands Trains at the end of 2020, and the Class 170 units will move to East Midlands Railway, with the exception of the centre cars of the 170/6s which moved to CrossCountry to lengthen its 170/5s.

The first of these new units entered service on the Shrewsbury line on 17 October 2022.

Class 230 D-Trains
West Midlands Trains are also the first operator of the Class 230, a new class of diesel electric multiple unit that are upcycled London Underground D78 Stock. 
During October 2017, the company announced its plans to procure three two-car D-Train units for use on the Marston Vale line. During April 2019, four months later than intended, the first Class 230 entered regular service.

Class 319, 323, and 350 EMUs
The Class 319, Class 323 and all Class 350/2 units will be replaced by brand new Class 730 units.

Seventeen of the Class 323 units will be transferred to Northern Trains to work with the existing 323 units already in service with them.

Future fleet
In October 2017, details were announced of planned new rolling stock for West Midlands Trains. Specifically, West Midlands Trains placed orders for 26 new CAF Civity diesel multiple units (80 carriages) as well as 81 electric multiple units based on Bombardier Transportation's Aventra platform (333 carriages), when combined, this totals 107 new trains that will be operated by the company.

Class 730 Aventra
Eighty-one Class 730 Aventras sets are to be purchased. They will be built at Derby Litchurch Lane Works. 36 three car trains and 45 five car trains will be built.

Past fleet
Former units operated by West Midlands Trains include:

Notes

References

External links

East Japan Railway Company
Mitsui & Co.
Nederlandse Spoorwegen
Railway companies established in 2017
Railway operators in London
Train operating companies in the United Kingdom
2017 establishments in England